Kiyauk (Qıyawıq) is a river in Ishimbaysky District, Bashkortostan, Russia. It is a left tributary of the Zigan.

References

Ishimbaysky District
Rivers of Bashkortostan